Halse og Harkmark is a former municipality in the old Vest-Agder county, Norway.  The  municipality existed from 1838 until its dissolution in 1964. The administrative centre of the municipality was the village of Halse, which at that time was a suburb of the town of Mandal. It was located in the southern part of the municipality of Mandal. The municipality of Halse og Harkmark encompassed the rural areas that surrounded the town of Mandal, including many islands such as Hille, Skjernøy, and Pysen (Norway's southernmost point). It is now located within Lindesnes Municipality in what is now Agder county.

History
Mandals landdistrikt was established as a municipality on 1 January 1838 (see formannskapsdistrikt law). It encompassed all the rural areas surrounding the town of Mandal. In 1865, the name was changed to Halse og Harkmark since those were the names of the two parishes surrounding Mandal.  On 1 July 1921, a part of Halse og Harkmark (population: 221) was transferred to the town of Mandal. During the 1960s, there were many municipal mergers across Norway due to the work of the Schei Committee. On 1 January 1964, Halse og Harkmark (population: 3676) was merged with the town of Mandal and most of the neighboring municipality of Holum (population: 1,127) to form a new Mandal municipality.

Name
Halse og Harkmark (literally: Halse and Harkmark) is a combination of the names of two parishes surrounding the town of Mandal. The name Halse is the name of the site where Mandal Church is located. The name comes from the Old Norse name Halshaugar, where hals means a low area of land between two waters and haugr meaning hill or mound. The name Harkmark may be derived from an old river name.

Government
All municipalities in Norway, including Halse og Harkmark, are responsible for primary education (through 10th grade), outpatient health services, senior citizen services, unemployment and other social services, zoning, economic development, and municipal roads.  The municipality was governed by a municipal council of elected representatives, which in turn elected a mayor.

Municipal council
The municipal council  of Halse og Harkmark was made up of representatives that were elected to four year terms.  The party breakdown of the final municipal council was as follows:

See also
List of former municipalities of Norway

References

Lindesnes
Former municipalities of Norway
1838 establishments in Norway
1964 disestablishments in Norway